Manuela Tîrneci (born 26 February 1969) is a Romanian athlete. She competed in the women's discus throw at the 1992 Summer Olympics.

References

1969 births
Living people
Athletes (track and field) at the 1992 Summer Olympics
Romanian female discus throwers
Olympic athletes of Romania
Place of birth missing (living people)